Dangerous Diamonds is the third album of the Italian heavy metal band Mastercastle, released by Lion Music on 18 November 2011.

History
The album was recorded from July to September 2011 at MusicArt studios (Genova, Italy). (Genoa, Italy), but the composition began on February. As for the previous album Last Desire, the producer was Pier Gonella.

Track listing
All lyrics were written by Giorgia Gueglio.

Line up
 Giorgia Gueglio – voice
 Pier Gonella – guitars
 Steve Vawamas – bass
 Alessandro Bissa Bix – drums

References

External links
 Mastercastle – Official myspace site of the band

2011 albums
Mastercastle albums